Hyatt House, or Hyett House, is a grade II listed building at 91 Westgate Street in the English city of Gloucester. The building is of a timber frame with stone and was probably constructed in the 16th century. According to a plaque on the building, an earlier dwelling stood on the site at least as early as 1455. The current façade was probably constructed by Nicholas Hyett (1709–1777), a local lawyer and justice of the peace. In 1988 the building was converted to flats by Avondown Housing Association and Gloucester City Council.

References

External links

Grade II listed buildings in Gloucestershire
Westgate, Gloucester
Hyett family